Vojtěch Flégl and Cyril Suk were the defending champions, but lost in the first round to Renzo Furlan and Guillermo Pérez Roldán.

Karel Nováček and Branislav Stankovič won the title by defeating Jonas Björkman and Jon Ireland 7–5, 6–1 in the final.

Seeds

Draw

Draw

References

External links
 Official results archive (ATP)
 Official results archive (ITF)

Prague Open (1987–1999)
1992 ATP Tour